Solofra (Solofrano:) is a town and comune in the province of Avellino, in the Campania region of Southern Italy.

Geography
The town is bordered by Aiello del Sabato, Calvanico (SA), Contrada, Montoro Superiore and Serino. Its frazioni are the villages of Sant'Agata Irpina and Sant'Andrea Apostolo.

Main sights
The Collegiata di San Michele Arcangelo was built in the 16th-17th centuries., and has rich interior decoration with canvases by the Guarino family, and an altarpiece of Giovanni Battista Lama.

Economy
Solofra is known as one of Italy's main centers for the tanning of leather.

References

External links

 Official website
 Local Police of Solofra
 Historical site about Solofra

Cities and towns in Campania